Leonid Anatolyevich Ratner (born 26 December 1937) is a Ukrainian handball coach for the Ukrainian women's national team.

References

External links
 Leonid Ratner. Interview 70th anniversary 
 Biography 

1937 births
Living people
Soviet male handball players
Ukrainian handball coaches
People from Kremenchuk
Merited Coaches of the Soviet Union
Soviet handball coaches
Ukrainian male handball players
Sportspeople from Poltava Oblast